Ashgate is an area in northeast Derbyshire, England, west of the town of Chesterfield. It is close to the town centre and local amenities.

A leading place of interest in the area is the Inkerman playing fields, formerly a Victorian swimming baths and a former area of pottery, most notably Brampton ware.

Other places of interest include the Woodside public house, which enjoys a prime location at the top of Ashgate hill. There is a wood that runs on from this roundabout, leading to Ashgate Hospice, dedicated to expertise in palliative care. Following along the route is the small, but quaint village of Old Brampton. The Ashgate area is adjacent to the districts of Brampton, Brockwell, Loundsley Green, Old Brampton and the town centre itself.

Geography of Derbyshire
Chesterfield, Derbyshire